Comoedia Mundi is a touring theatre group in Bavaria, Germany.

Theatre companies in Germany